A Soldier Came Back from the Front is a 1971 Soviet drama film directed by Nikolay Gubenko.

Plot 
The film tells about the soldier Nikolay, who returns from the front and learns that his wife is no longer alive. But, despite this, he continues to live and work on.

Cast 
 Mikhail Gluzskiy as Ivan Menshikov
 Irina Miroshnichenko as Vera Kurkina
 Nikolay Gubenko as Nikolay Maksimovich Yegorov
 Lena Smirnova as Nadenka Yegorova
 Misha Rodyakov as Leshenka
 O. Larionova
 Ivan Sharin as Yerofeich (as I. Sharin)
 Lyudmila Stoyanova
 Natalya Bondarchuk as Shura (as N. Bondarchuk)
 Alevtina Rumyantseva

References

External links 
 

1971 films
1970s Russian-language films
Soviet drama films
1971 drama films